Caradan is an unincorporated community in Mills County, located in the U.S. state of Texas. According to the Handbook of Texas, the community had a population of 20 in 2000.

History
The area in what is known as Caradan today was established in the 1880s and was named for Samuel Losson Caraway and Dan T. Bush, who were among the first settlers in the area. A post office was established at Caradan in 1889 and remained in operation until 1974. The community had a population of 15 in 1889 and grew to 29 in 1930 with five businesses. The number of businesses went down to two while the population went up to 75 in 1950. There was only one business and 18 people left in 1970, then gained two more residents from 1990 through 2000. There is also a cemetery in Caradan.

Geography

Education
Today, the community is served by the Goldthwaite Independent School District.

References

Unincorporated communities in Mills County, Texas
Unincorporated communities in Texas